Harold Raymond DeMoss Jr. (December 30, 1930 – April 29, 2020) was a former United States circuit judge of the United States Court of Appeals for the Fifth Circuit.

Education and career

DeMoss graduated from Rice University with a Bachelor of Arts degree in 1952 and the University of Texas School of Law with a Juris Doctor in 1955. After serving in the United States Army from 1955 to 1957, he joined the Houston law firm Bracewell & Patterson, where he became a partner and remained until his appointment to the bench. In 1988, he took a six-month sabbatical from the firm to work on the presidential campaign of George H. W. Bush.

Federal judicial service

DeMoss was nominated by President George H. W. Bush on June 27, 1991, to a seat on the United States Court of Appeals for the Fifth Circuit vacated by Judge Jerre Stockton Williams. He was confirmed by the United States Senate on November 27, 1991, and received commission on December 2, 1991. He assumed senior status on July 1, 2007. His service terminated on April 16, 2015, due to retirement.

References

External links

 Interview with Harold R. DeMoss Jr., Houston Lawyer, March–April 2002.

1930 births
2020 deaths
20th-century American judges
21st-century American judges
Judges of the United States Court of Appeals for the Fifth Circuit
People from Houston
Rice University alumni
United States court of appeals judges appointed by George H. W. Bush
University of Texas School of Law alumni